Events from the year 1921 in art.

Events
 March – Puhl & Wagner are contracted to decorate the interior of the Golden Hall (Stockholm City Hall) with neo-Byzantine mosaics designed by Einar Forseth.
 September–October – 5x5=25 abstract art exhibition held in Moscow.
 The experimental short documentary film Manhatta is shot by painter Charles Sheeler and photographer Paul Strand in New York City.
 Thomas Gainsborough's c. 1770 portrait The Blue Boy from the collection of the Duke of Westminster is sold by dealer Joseph Duveen to California magnate Henry E. Huntington for $728,800 (£182,200; equivalent to $ million in ), according to Duveen's bill, a record price for any painting at this time.
 Paul Sérusier publishes his ABC of Painting.
 André Delatte opens his glasswares studio in Nancy.
 Simon Rodia begins construction of the Watts Towers in Los Angeles.

Awards
 Archibald Prize: W B McInnes – Desbrowe Annear

Works

 Carlo Carrà – The Engineer's Lover
 Dora Carrington – Farm at Watendlath
 Charles Demuth – Incense of a New Church
 Guy Pène du Bois – An American Oriental
 Marcel Duchamp – Why Not Sneeze, Rose Sélavy? (assisted readymade)
 Max Ernst – The Elephant Celebes
 Lady Feodora Gleichen – 37th (British) Division memorial (Monchy-le-Preux, France)
Daniel Chester French – Statue of the Marquis de Lafayette
 J. W. Godward – Megilla
 Duncan Grant – Bathers by the Pond
 Auguste Herbin – Le Cateau-Cambrésis
 Edward Hopper – Girl at Sewing Machine
 Seán Keating – Men of the South
 Ernst Ludwig Kirchner
 Two Brothers
 View of Basel and the Rhine
 Boris Kustodiev – Portrait of Chaliapin
 Fernand Léger
 Man and Woman
 Still Life with a Beer Mug
 Wyndham Lewis – Mr Wyndham Lewis as a Tyro
 Sir Bertram Mackennal – Bronze equestrian statue of King Edward VII (Waterloo Place, London)
 Piet Mondrian
 Composition with Red, Yellow and Blue
 Tableau I
 Paul Moreau-Vauthier – Western Front demarcation stones
 Edvard Munch – Model by the Wicker Chair
 Alfred Munnings – The Red Prince Mare
 Francis Picabia
 The Cacodylic Eye
 Cannibale
 Pablo Picasso
 Reading the Letter
 Three Musicians (Museum of Modern Art, New York)
 Man Ray (with Erik Satie) – The Gift (readymade sculpture)
 Stanley Spencer
 Christ's Entry into Jerusalem
 Crucifixion
 Félix Vallotton – Femme nue dormant au bord de l'eau
 Han van Meegeren – Hertje ("The fawn")

Births

January to June
 January 1 – César Baldaccini, French sculptor (d. 1998)
 January 3 – Bill Gold, American graphic designer (d. 2018)
 January 14 – Norris Embry, American neo-expressionist painter (d. 1981)
 January 24 – Sybil Connolly, Welsh-Irish fashion designer (d. 1998)
 January 27 – Georges Mathieu, French abstract painter (d. 2012)
 February 2 – Pietro Cascella, Italian painter and sculptor (d. 2008)
 February 5 – Ken Adam, German-born British film set designer (d. 2016)
 February 13 – Louis Féraud, French fashion designer and artist (d. 1999)
 February 20 – Michael Ayrton, English sculptor, graphic artist and writer (d. 1975)
 February 22 – Cecil King, Irish abstract-minimalist painter (d. 1986)
 February 23 – John Latham, Zambian conceptual artist (d. 2006)
 March 2 – Ernst Haas, Austrian photographer (d. 1986)
 March 13 – Al Jaffee, American cartoonist
 March 28 – Norman Bluhm, American painter (d. 1999)
 April 21 – Dimitrije Bašičević, Serbian painter and sculptor (d. 1987)
 April 23 – William Brice, American painter and teacher (d. 2008)
 April 25 – Karel Appel, Dutch painter, sculptor and poet (d. 2006)
 May 18 – Joan Eardley, British painter (d. 1963)
 May 29 – Enzo Plazzotta, Italian-born British sculptor (d. 1981)
 June 20 – Fiore de Henriquez, Italian-born British sculptor (d. 2004)

July to December
 July 16
 Ernst Beyeler, Swiss art dealer and collector (d. 2010)
 Guy Laroche, French fashion designer (d. 1989)
 July 16 – Boscoe Holder, Trinidadian painter (d. 2007)
 July 17 – Richard Jeranian, Armenian painter, draftsman and lithographer (d. 2019)
 August 4 – Jean Pierre Capron, French painter (d. 1997)
 August 18 – Zdzisław Żygulski, Jr., Polish art historian (d. 2015)
 August 28 – Jean-Philippe Charbonnier, French photographer (d. 2004)
 September 22 – Will Elder, American illustrator and comic book artist (d. 2008)
 September 25 – Jacques Martin, French comics creator
 September 27 – Jean-Pierre Sudre, French photographer (d. 1997)
 October 26 – Raymond Nasher, American art collector (d. 2007)
 November 12 – Gerson Leiber, American painter, lithographer and sculptor (d. 2018)
 November 17 – Albert Bertelsen, Danish artist (d. 2019)

Deaths
 January 18 – Adolf von Hildebrand, sculptor (born 1847)
 January 30 – John Francis Murphy, landscape painter (born 1853)
 February 2 – Antonio Jacobsen, Danish-American maritime artist (born 1850)
 February 3 – William Strang, painter and engraver (born 1859)
 February 4 – Eugène Burnand, Swiss painter (born 1850)
 February 11 – William Blake Richmond, English painter and designer (born 1842)
 February 21 – George Dunlop Leslie, English genre painter (born 1835)
 March 2 – Johann Friedrich Engel, German painter (born 1844)
 March 23 – Jean-Paul Laurens, painter and sculptor (born 1838)
 March 24 – Marcus Stone, painter and illustrator (born 1840)
 March 30 – Franz Benque, photographer (born 1841)
 April 6 – Vardges Sureniants, Armenian painter (born 1860)
 April 30 – Mabel Esplin, English stained-glass artist (born 1874)
 May 5 – William Friese-Greene, photographer and cinematographer (born 1855)
 May 29 – Abbott Handerson Thayer, painter (born 1849)
 June – Frank Enders, painter and etcher (born 1860)
 October 7 – John Thomson, photographer (born 1837)
 November 1 – Francisco Pradilla Ortiz, painter (born 1848)
 November 12 – Fernand Khnopff, Symbolist painter (born 1858)
 November 13 – William Robert Colton, sculptor (born 1867)

References

 
Years of the 20th century in art
1920s in art